Ireneusz Jeleń  (born 9 April 1981) is a retired Polish footballer who played as a right-winger or striker for the Poland national football team.

Club career
Jeleń was born in Cieszyn. From 2002 to 2006 he played for Wisła Płock in the Ekstraklasa. In four seasons he scored 45 goals in 100 appearances in the Polish top league.

On 28 June 2006, Jeleń signed for Auxerre in Ligue 1. On 9 September  2006, Jeleń scored his first league goal for Auxerre against Monaco. On 20 October 2007, he grabbed his first hat-trick, after coming off the bench in the 71st minute against FC Lorient. In his first couple of seasons at Auxerre, Jeleń was plagued with recurring back problems. In October 2008 he suffered a broken collarbone. He returned to action in late January 2009. Auxerre's manager Jean Fernandez has described Jeleń as the player in his squad having the most ability in front of goal. Prior to his return, Auxerre was in 17th place, barely above the relegation zone. Upon his return, Jeleń scored 11 goals in 16 league matches, with Auxerre advancing to 8th in the table. Despite missing part of the season, Jelen tied for 4th in the Ligue 1 goalscoring charts. In May 2009, he was voted Auxerre's Player of the Season, garnering 79% of the votes. In July 2009, France Football ranked him 4th among strikers and 15th overall among footballers playing in Ligue 1.

In December 2009 he was voted Polish Player of the Year.

During the 2009–10 season, he helped Auxerre to finish third in the league and win a place in the 2010–11 UEFA Champions League Play-off round. He finished fifth in the Ligue 1 goalscoring charts with 14 goals, despite missing some matches due to injury. Auxerre lost only once (at Grenoble 0–5) with Jeleń in the line up on 6 February 2010.

Jeleń signed a contract as a free agent with Lille at the end of August, after his contract with Auxerre expired.

After refusing to go to Stade Brestois 29, he was soon left without a club. He returned to Poland and signed for Ekstraklasa side Podbeskidzie Bielsko-Biała but after a poor half of the season he was released. After a short stint at Górnik Zabrze, where he left due to his father's illness he finished his career at the local club he started his career with, Piast Cieszyn, before eventually retiring in 2014.

Since 2019, Jeleń has been playing for CKS Piast.

International career

As of October 2011, Jeleń has 28 caps with the Polish national team. He was selected for the 23-man squad that took part in the 2006 FIFA World Cup finals in Germany and played in all three of the Group A games, almost scoring with an impressive left foot shot that hit the crossbar against Ecuador in their 2–0 defeat. His trademarks are speed and acceleration. Jelen failed to make Poland's squad for their upcoming Euro 2012 campaign, however he was placed on standby.

Personal life
Jeleń was born the middle of three children, having an older sister and a younger brother. He and his wife, Anna, have a son, Jakub, born in 2003, and a daughter, Julia, born in January 2010.

Career statistics

Club

International goals

Honours

Club
Wisła Płock
 Polish Cup: 2005–06; finalist 2002–03

References

External links
  
 
 

1981 births
Living people
Sportspeople from Silesian Voivodeship
2006 FIFA World Cup players
Association football forwards
Polish footballers
Wisła Płock players
AJ Auxerre players
Lille OSC players
Podbeskidzie Bielsko-Biała players
Górnik Zabrze players
Expatriate footballers in France
Poland international footballers
People from Cieszyn
Ligue 1 players
Polish expatriate footballers
Ekstraklasa players